The 1945 Clemson Tigers football team was an American football team that represented Clemson College during the 1945 college football season. In its sixth season under head coach Frank Howard, the team compiled a 6–3–1 record (2–1–1 against conference opponents), finished fourth in the conference, and outscored opponents by a total of 211 to 73. The team played its home games at Memorial Stadium in Clemson, South Carolina.

Center Ralph Jenkins was the team captain. The team's statistical leaders included tailback Marion Butler with 239 passing yards, fullback Dewey Quinn with 392 rushing yards, and Butler and fullback Jim Reynolds with 30 points scored (5 touchdowns each).

Tackle Bob Turner and center Ralph Jenkins were selected as first-team players on the 1945 All-Southern Conference football team.

Schedule

References

Clemson
Clemson Tigers football seasons
Clemson Tigers football